Dirt track racing is a type of auto racing performed on oval tracks in South Africa. Dirt track racing classes are, as elsewhere, similar to those raced at the tar (asphalt) oval track racing venues. The dirt track classes include Hot Rods, 1600 Modified Saloons, Modified Non-contact Saloons, V8 American Saloons, and Midgets.

See also
List of dirt track ovals in South Africa

External links
MSA Motorsport South Africa

South Africa
Motorsport in South Africa